Lewis Mills may refer to:

 Lewis Mills (basketball) (1937–2011), basketball coach
 Lewis Mills (rugby league) (born 1989), Wales international rugby league footballer
 Lewis Este Mills (1836–1878), American lawyer and author
 Lewis S. Mills (1874–1965), American educator and author

See also
 Lewis H. Mills House (disambiguation)
 Lewis Mill (disambiguation)